Fuat Balkan (28 August 1887 – 28 May 1970) was a Turkish sabre fencer. He competed at the 1924 and 1928 Summer Olympics.

References

External links
 

1887 births
1970 deaths
Turkish people of Circassian descent
Sportspeople from Istanbul
Ottoman Military Academy alumni
Ottoman Army officers
Ottoman military personnel of the Balkan Wars
Ottoman military personnel of World War I
Members of the Special Organization (Ottoman Empire)
Turkish people of the Turkish War of Independence
Turkish male sabre fencers
Olympic fencers of Turkey
Fencers at the 1924 Summer Olympics
Fencers at the 1928 Summer Olympics
Beşiktaş J.K. presidents
Deputies of Edirne
Deputies of Kocaeli